Save My Soul is the fourth studio album by swing group Big Bad Voodoo Daddy. It was released by Vanguard Records on July 8, 2003.

Track listing
All songs written by Scotty Morris, except where noted.
Zig Zaggity Woop Woop Pt. 1 - 2:32
You Know You Wrong - 4:47
Always Gonna Get Ya - 2:52
"Don't You" Feel My Leg (D.K. Baker, K. Harris) - 4:58
Oh Yeah - 4:36
Simple Songs - 4:29
Next Week Sometime (Traditional) - 3:21
Save My Soul - 6:34
I Like It - 4:19
Zig Zaggity Woop Woop Pt. 2 - 4:44
Unlisted Track

Personnel
Scotty Morris - vocals, guitar
Karl Hunter - clarinet, soprano saxophone, tenor saxophone
Andy Rowley - baritone saxophone, background vocals
Glen "The Kid" Marhevka - trumpet, cornet
Joshua Levy - piano, arranger
Dirk Shumaker - double bass, background vocals
Kurt Sodergren - drums

Additional personnel
Ron Blake - trumpet
Lenny Castro - percussion
Lee Thornburg - trumpet
Ira Nepus - trombone
John Noreyko - sousaphone
Yoko Ono & Plastics band failure

Charts

References

2003 albums
Big Bad Voodoo Daddy albums
Capitol Records albums